John Barnes (born 1957 in Angola, Indiana) is an American science fiction author.

Writing
Two of his novels, The Sky So Big and Black and The Duke of Uranium have been reviewed as having content appropriate for a young adult readership, comparing favorably to Robert A. Heinlein's "juvenile" novels. He has contributed to the Internet Evolution website.

Technical career
He has done work in systems analysis, business statistics, software reliability theory, sentiment analysis, statistical semiotics, and formal specification.

Personal life
Barnes's hometown is Bowling Green, Ohio. Barnes earned a B.A. degree from Washington University in St. Louis, an M.A. degree from the University of Montana, and a Ph.D. degree in theater from the University of Pittsburgh. He has taught at Western State College. He lives in Colorado. Barnes has been married three times and divorced twice.

Bibliography

Century Next Door series
Orbital Resonance (1991)
Kaleidoscope Century (1995)
Candle (2000)
The Sky So Big and Black (2002)

Thousand Cultures series
The four novels in the Thousand Cultures series include the theme of the effects of globalization, at an interstellar scale, on isolated societies.
A Million Open Doors (1992)  
Earth Made of Glass (1998)  
The Merchants of Souls (2001) 
The Armies of Memory (2006)

Time Raider series
Wartide (1992)
Battle Cry (1992)
Union Fires (1992)

Timeline Wars series
Patton's Spaceship (1997)
Washington's Dirigible (1997) 
Caesar's Bicycle (1997)
Timeline Wars (1997) (omnibus volume)
"Upon Their Backs, to Bite 'Em" (2000) (a crossover story included in Drakas!)

Jak Jinnaka series
Duke of Uranium (2002)
A Princess of the Aerie (2003) 
In the Hall of the Martian King (2003)

Daybreak series
Directive 51 (2010)
Daybreak Zero (2011)
The Last President (2014)

The Last President was originally scheduled for 2012, but was delayed due to disagreements between Barnes and the publisher over the direction the series was taking. The final book in the series was published by Ace in 2014. Barnes is considering re-writing the first two books to make them more consistent with his original conception of the series.

Other books
The Man Who Pulled Down the Sky (1987)
Sin of Origin (1988)
Mother of Storms (1994)
Encounter With Tiber (with Buzz Aldrin (1996)
One For the Morning Glory (1996)
Apocalypses and Apostrophes (1998) (a short story collection also published as Apostrophes and Apocalypses)
Finity (1999)
The Return, with Buzz Aldrin (2001)
Gaudeamus (2004) (meta-referential work blending fiction and reality)
Payback City (2007) (thriller, written in 1997, self-published e-book)
Tales of the Madman Underground: An Historical Romance, 1973 (2009) (YA/non-SF, a Michael L. Printz Award Honor Book)
Losers in Space (2012) (YA/SF)
Raise the Gipper! (2012) (SF/fantasy/political satire)

Short fiction
"The Birds and the Bees and the Gasoline Trees" (2010) (short story, in Engineering Infinity, edited by Jonathan Strahan)

Awards
Nebula Award Best Novel nominee (1992) : Orbital Resonance
Nebula Award Best Novel nominee (1993) : A Million Open Doors
Hugo Award Best Novel nominee (1995) : Mother of Storms
Nebula Award Best Novel nominee (1996) : Mother of Storms
Michael L. Printz Award Honor Book (2010): Tales of the Madman Underground: An Historical Romance 1973

See also
 One True, fictional artificial intelligence central to the Century Next Door series.

References

External links

Barnes personal weblog
Barnes weblog (old, inactive)
2008 interview at HardSF website

1957 births
Living people
20th-century American novelists
20th-century American male writers
21st-century American novelists
American male novelists
American science fiction writers
American male short story writers
20th-century American short story writers
21st-century American short story writers
21st-century American male writers
Washington University in St. Louis alumni
University of Montana alumni
University of Pittsburgh alumni
Western State Colorado University faculty